Budhana Assembly constituency is one of the 403 constituencies of the Uttar Pradesh Legislative Assembly, India. It is a part of the Muzaffarnagar district and one of the six assembly constituencies in the Muzaffarnagar Lok Sabha constituency. First elections in this assembly constituency were held in 1957 after the "Final Order DC (1953-1955)" was passed. The constituency ceased to exist in 1967 post "Delimitation Orders (1967)" was passed. In 2008, the assembly constituency was again created during the "Delimitation of Parliamentary and Assembly Constituencies Order, 2008".

Wards / Areas

Extent of Budhana Assembly constituency is Budhana Tehsil (except PCs Nala, Taharpur Bhabisa, Kaniyan, Salfa and Sunna of Budhana KC).

Members of the Legislative Assembly

Election results

2022

2017

2012

1958

1957

See also

Government of Uttar Pradesh
Muzaffarnagar Lok Sabha constituency
List of Vidhan Sabha constituencies of Uttar Pradesh
Muzaffarnagar district
Sixteenth Legislative Assembly of Uttar Pradesh
Uttar Pradesh Legislative Assembly
Uttar Pradesh

References

External links
 

Assembly constituencies of Uttar Pradesh
Politics of Muzaffarnagar district